is a 2001 fighting video game developed by Team Ninja and published by Tecmo for the Xbox console as one of its launch titles. It is the third main entry in the Dead or Alive fighting series. Dead or Alive 3 improved upon the gameplay and graphics in superior detail compared to that of its predecessors.

The game's story focuses on DOATEC's attempt to create the ultimate human weapon through their Omega Project by capturing and transforming the Mugen Tenshin Ninja Clan's Hajin Mon leader, Genra, into an evil superhuman called Omega. The ninjas enter the third Dead or Alive tournament to defeat Omega.

Dead or Alive 3 was critically acclaimed and a commercial success upon release, selling over 1 million copies worldwide in the first five months after its release, and went on to sell over 2 million copies, becoming one of the top 10 best selling Xbox games. The game won several awards and was nominated for many others. The European and Japanese versions were released months later, featuring additional content and updates that weren't featured in the North American version. Dead or Alive 3 was later followed by Dead or Alive Ultimate in 2004 and Dead or Alive 4 in 2005.

Dead or Alive 3 would later become backwards compatible with the Xbox 360. On November 10, 2021, all versions of Dead or Alive 3 were made available to download from Xbox Live worldwide. On November 15, 2021, all versions were made backward compatible with the Xbox One and Xbox Series X/S.

Gameplay

The basic gameplay controls remain essentially unchanged from Dead or Alive 2. Some minor tweaks have been added to the game system in the form of increased counter periods, unrestricted 3D-axis movement, and less emphasis on juggling combos. All these gameplay enhancements make the game suitable for beginners, and makes the artificial intelligence a bit more forgiving. Move properties for character attacks are updated. The game incorporated less damage percentiles in counter hold maneuvers, making players rely more on blows and throws to defeat opponents. Fighters who are caught in hazardous falls can now be knocked out if they have very low health.

The game adds a new feature in its Sparring mode called "Exercise", an automatic command tutorial that teaches players how to perform attacks. One Command is displayed onscreen at a time during gameplay and changes after being successfully performed, therefore players can easily practice learning character moves while commands are displayed at the same time.

The Tag team system, introduced in the previous game, was also updated. Tag Battle matches are made available to select in the game's Time Attack and Survival modes. A new mechanic called "Attack Change" was added, allowing the character tagging in to attack while switching in. The Tag Throws command was made a bit easier to activate.

As with previous entries in the series, the game takes advantage of the Xbox system's power to push the range of the graphics and stage sizes farther than Dead or Alive 2. The game has less unlockable content compared to DOA2: Hardcore. By default, the game utilizes the Xbox controller's pressure sensitive analog face buttons to allow shortcuts in performing certain moves, making the controls lenient to allow players new to the series to adapt to gameplay, players have the option to turn the analog buttons on or off.

European and Japanese versions 
Months after the initial North American release of the game, the European and Japanese versions featured many gameplay changes such as new attacks for characters, tweaked move properties for attacks, more unlockable content, much better sidestepping movements that allows players to dodge most attacks, and the Xbox controller's analog stick doesn't deactivate when the analog buttons are turned off.

Characters

Dead or Alive 3 features a total of 18 fighters, including 17 playable characters and the boss character Omega. The characters returning from the previous installments are Ayane, Bass Armstrong, Bayman, Ein (unlockable), Gen Fu, Helena Douglas, Jann Lee, Kasumi, Leifang, Leon, Ryu Hayabusa, Tina Armstrong, and Zack. Playable newcomers are Chinese drunken fighter Brad Wong, British assassin Christie, Japanese ninja Hayate (appeared in the roster of the previous title as "Ein"), and German-Japanese karateka Hitomi.

New
Brad Wong, a Chinese drunken fighter whose teacher, Chen, sends him on a journey to search for the mysterious wine called "Genra". After three years of wandering, he finds himself in the Dead or Alive tournament.
Christie, a British assassin and she-quan practitioner hired by Victor Donovan, leader of DOATEC's anti-Douglas faction. She enters the tournament in order to keep an eye on Helena.
Hayate, a Japanese ninja and the 18th leader of the Mugen Tenshin Ninja Clan, who appeared in the previous game as "Ein". He enters the tournament again in order to defeat Genra, the superhuman created as a puppet of DOATEC's Project Omega.
Hitomi, a German-Japanese karateka who always wanted to fight in the Dead or Alive tournament. After getting permission from her father, she joins the tournament in order to test her formidable skills against the real world.
Omega (unplayable), the evil superhuman of DOATEC's Project Omega who used to be Genra, the leader of the Mugen Tenshin's Hajin Mon sect and Ayane's foster father.

Returning

Ayane
Bass Armstrong
Bayman
Ein (unlockable)
Gen Fu
Helena Douglas
Jann Lee
Kasumi
Leifang
Leon
Ryu Hayabusa
Tina Armstrong
Zack

Plot
The hero ninja Ryu Hayabusa put a stop to the evil doings of Tengu during the last tournament, but it was too late to stop him from triggering a massive worldwide collapse. A dense cloud covered the entire planet in a shroud of darkness and fear. DOATEC has gone astray, turning into the hunting grounds for power-hungry scam artists.

This is when DOATEC's development department (a fortress for state-of-the-art military technology) witnesses the success of a genius. Following Project Alpha and Project Epsilon, the ever ambitious scientist, Dr. Victor Donovan completes the Omega Project, producing a new superhuman: Genra. The man, who was once leader of the Hajin Mon ninjas of the Mugen Tenshin Ninja Clan, is no longer human, but a force of singular and unprecedented capabilities known as Omega. To test the subject Omega's skills, DOATEC announced the third Dead or Alive World Combat Championship.

The ninjas Hayate, Ayane, and Ryu Hayabusa enter the third tournament to defeat Genra. Bayman, the assassin who was once hired by Victor Donovan to kill Fame Douglas during the first tournament, enters the third tournament to get revenge on Donovan after he sent a mysterious sniper to kill him. Bayman easily quashed the sniper, but the feeble attempt on his life left Bayman in anger and in retaliation against Donovan. Helena Douglas, daughter of Fame Douglas was captured by the anti-Douglas faction of DOATEC led by Donovan. Whether Helena likes it or not, she is dragged into the intertwined conspiracies within the huge DOATEC organization. Donovan challenges Helena to win the third tournament. If she wins, she will regain her freedom and learn the truth behind DOATEC. To prevent Helena from winning, Donovan hires a British assassin named Christie to keep an eye on her, and kill her if necessary.

As the tournament is underway, Kasumi, who is hunted and forced to defend herself from multiple attempts on her life by highly skilled ninja assassins, due to her status as a runaway ninja, desires to see her brother Hayate again. She cross paths with her half-sister Ayane, who states that she can see Hayate if she wants as she's more focused on defeating Genra. Kasumi meets with Hayate, who's torn between the ninja code and his love for his sister. He decides to save Kasumi by pretending he didn't meet with her. Afterwards, an argument is made between the ninjas on who should defeat Genra. Hayabusa is prepared to bring down Genra, but Hayate states to Hayabusa that he does not know Genra like he does since he and Genra are from the same clan. Hayate also states that since he is the new leader of the Mugen Tenshin, he should defeat Genra instead. Later, both Ayane and Hayate argue on who should defeat Genra. Ayane, as a Hajin Mon ninja and Genra's foster daughter, feels that fate commands her to put Genra out of his misery and that it is her duty to defeat him. Eventually, Hajin Mon's Ayane wins the third DOA tournament and kills Genra.

Development and release

After the success of Dead or Alive 2, Tecmo was working on continuing the series when Microsoft approached them, offering a deal to develop the next Dead or Alive as an exclusive title for the recently announced Xbox. The Xbox was still in development, and Microsoft was in need of exclusive, high-profile games to show off the technical capability of their product. This deal also fit in with series creator Tomonobu Itagaki's design philosophy of always targeting the most powerful console available for the development of Dead or Alive games.

In 2001, the release of Dead or Alive 3 was announced in Japan, but the game was first released in the US, in order to coincide with the American Xbox launch. An updated version of Dead or Alive 3 was then released for the Japanese and European Xbox launches several months later.

The European and Japanese versions of Dead or Alive 3 feature more content such as extra costumes, new attacks for characters, and a new cinematic introduction for the game. Because of its early release, the North American version does not feature any of the above. In June 2002, Official Xbox Magazine provided a 'Booster Disc' for Dead or Alive 3 which included the new cinematic introduction and all of the extra costumes released on the EU and JP versions of the game, but it did not however contain the extra fighting moves or general game balancing tweaks that the other versions brought. The booster content continued to be provided with the Official Xbox Magazine demo disc from June 2002 to September 2002; each disc featured the same content but gave magazine buyers multiple times to acquire it. The booster content was also provided on the Xbox Exhibition Volume 1 disc. The Platinum Collection edition of the game was released in 2003.

In addition to the original song in the game, three songs by the American rock band Aerosmith also appear in Dead or Alive 3 and can also be played in the game's Settings option. "Nine Lives" was the opening theme, and "Home Tonight" was played over the credits. "Amazing" was not used in the actual game, but was a music sample under the Settings option.

An Arcade Stick for Dead or Alive 3 made by Japanese video game peripheral manufacturer, Hori, was released exclusively for the Xbox on February 22, 2002, in order to coincide with the Dead or Alive 3 and Xbox launch in Japan.

A soundtrack CD for the game, titled Dead or Alive 3 Original Sound Trax (KWCD-1006), was released by Wake Up in 2002. A guide book titled Dead or Alive 3: Prima's Official Strategy Guide by Prima Games was published in North America on November 5, 2001. Three more guide books were published in Japan in early 2002: Dead or Alive 3 Guide Book (デッド オア アライブ3 ガイドブック) by Famitsu / Enterbrain, Dead or Alive 3 Kōshiki Kōryaku Guide (デッド オア アライブ3 公式攻略ガイド) by Kodansha, and Dead or Alive 3 Perfect Guide (デッド オア アライブ3 パーフェクトガイド) by SoftBank.

Backwards Compatibility and Re-release 
Dead or Alive 3 later became backwards compatible with the Xbox 360. On November 10, 2021, Dead or Alive 3 became available to download on Xbox Live worldwide. As of November 15, 2021, Dead or Alive 3 is now backward compatible with the Xbox One and Xbox Series X/S.
 
The European and Japanese versions of Dead or Alive 3, which featured more content, can be downloaded from Xbox Live on American Xbox platforms by purchasing the game in the Microsoft Store first, then changing the region in the Xbox settings to either United Kingdom or Japan, and restarting the console before downloading. The console can be switched back to the American region after the download is complete.

Reception

Upon its release, Dead or Alive 3 received generally favorable reviews, three points shy of "universal acclaim", according to the review aggregation website Metacritic. Anthony Chau of IGN stated that it "represents the new standard of excellence that only the Xbox can deliver," praising the game for its great attention to detail and its vast improvements on its predecessor. On the other hand, GameSpots Greg Kasavin opined that "once you get past its graphics, you'll find that Dead or Alive 3 doesn't offer much of anything that hasn't been done in other 3D fighting games." NextGen said that the game was "Quite possibly the best 3D fighting game ever made, both in graphics and gameplay." In Japan, Famitsu gave it a score of 37 out of 40.

Dead or Alive 3 was awarded "Console Fighting Game of the Year" by the Academy of Interactive Arts & Sciences, and was a runner-up for the "Outstanding Achievement in Animation" award, which went to Oddworld: Munch's Oddysee. The game was also awarded "Outstanding Fighting Game Sequel" and nominated for "Outstanding Animation in a Game Engine" by the National Academy of Video Game Trade Reviewers. The game was also awarded "Best Console Fighting Game" and was nominated for "Best Graphics in a Console Game", "Best Multiplayer Console Game", and "Xbox Game of the Year" by The Electric Playground. The game won GameSpots annual "Best Graphics, Technical" prize among console games, but also received a nomination in the "Most Disappointing Game" category, and was a runner-up for the "Best Xbox Game" category. The game was also nominated for "Xbox Game of the Year" at the Golden Joystick Awards.

The game is one of the best-selling installments in the series. In 2002, Tecmo announced the game had reached sales of over 1 million units worldwide in the first five months after its release, and went on to sell over 2 million units worldwide. By July 2006, it had sold 950,000 copies and earned $36 million in the U.S. alone. NextGen ranked it as the 59th highest-selling game launched for the PlayStation 2, Xbox or GameCube between January 2000 and July 2006 in that country. Combined sales of Dead or Alive fighting games released in the 2000s reached 1.3 million units in the U.S. by July 2006. The game became the third best-selling launch title next to Microsoft's Halo: Combat Evolved and Project Gotham Racing and the first third-party Xbox game to garner Platinum status. 

In 2008, CinemaBlend ranked it as the eight best fighting game of all time. In 2011, Complex ranked it as the 15th best fighting game of all time. GamesRadar+ included it among the Xbox games "that shaped the generation," and later included it in their list of the "best original Xbox games".

References

External links
 (Tecmo)
 (Team Ninja) 

2001 video games
3D fighting games
Dead or Alive (franchise) video games
Interactive Achievement Award winners
Fighting games
Tag team videogames
Tecmo games
Video game sequels
Video games featuring female protagonists
Xbox games
Xbox-only games
Esports games
Multiplayer and single-player video games
Video games with alternative versions
Science fiction video games
Video games with AI-versus-AI modes
Video games about ninja
Video games about revenge
Martial arts video games
Video games developed in Japan
Video games set in Venezuela
Video games set in Iceland
Video games set in Japan
Video games set in Hong Kong
Video games set in Germany
Video games set in the United States
Video games set on islands
Video games set in Italy
Video games set in Australia
Video games set in Saudi Arabia
Video games set in China
Video games set in the 21st century
D.I.C.E. Award for Fighting Game of the Year winners
Koei Tecmo games